This is a list of hospitals in the French overseas department and region of French Guiana. 
The following hospitals are located in French Guiana:
 Andrée-Rosemon Hospital, Cayenne (full service hospital)
 Centre Hospitalier de Cayenne, Saint-Georges-de-l'Oyapock
 Centre Hospitalier de Kourou, Kourou
 Centre Hospitalier de l’Ouest Guyanais, Saint-Laurent du Maroni
 Private Hospital Saint-Paul, Cayenne

Historical hospitals
 André-Bouron Hospital, Saint-Laurent du Maroni (In use until September 2018)

References

hospitals
Health in French Guiana
List